Annemarie Selinko (1 September 1914 – 28 July 1986) was an Austrian novelist who wrote a number of best-selling books in German from the 1930s through the 1950s. Although she had been based in Germany, in 1939 at the start of World War II she took refuge in Denmark with her Danish husband, but then in 1943, they again became refugees, this time to Sweden.

Many of her novels have been adapted into movies and all have been translated into numerous languages. Her last work Désirée (1951) was about Désirée Clary, the one-time fiancée of Napoleon Bonaparte and later Queen of Sweden and Norway. It is dedicated to her sister Liselotte, who was murdered by the Nazis. Translated into 25 languages, in 1954 it was turned into a major Hollywood film starring Marlon Brando and Jean Simmons.

Bibliography

Novels
 Ich war ein häßliches Mädchen (I Was an Ugly Girl), Vienna: Kirschner Verlag, 1937
 Morgen ist alles besser (US title: Tomorrow Is Another Day, UK title: Everything Will Be Better Tomorrow), 1939
 Heute heiratet mein Mann (My Husband Marries Today), 1943
 Désirée, 1952

Filmography 
Tomorrow It Will Be Better, directed by Frederic Zelnik (Netherlands, 1939, based on the novel Morgen ist alles besser)
, directed by Ragnar Arvedson (Sweden, 1943, based on the novel Heute heiratet mein Mann)
Everything Will Be Better in the Morning, directed by Arthur Maria Rabenalt (West Germany, 1948, based on the novel Morgen ist alles besser)
Désirée, directed by Henry Koster (1954, based on the novel Désirée)
I Was an Ugly Girl, directed by Wolfgang Liebeneiner (West Germany, 1955, based on the novel Ich war ein häßliches Mädchen)
My Husband's Getting Married Today, directed by Kurt Hoffmann (West Germany, 1956, based on the novel Heute heiratet mein Mann)
, directed by Géza von Bolváry (West Germany, 1957, based on the novel Morgen ist alles besser)

References

1914 births
1986 deaths
Writers from Vienna
Austrian emigrants to Denmark
Jewish emigrants from Austria after the Anschluss
Austrian women novelists
Danish Jews
Naturalised citizens of Denmark
20th-century women writers
20th-century Austrian novelists
Burials at Hellerup Cemetery